Felimare fortunensis is a species of sea slug or dorid nudibranch, a marine gastropod mollusc in the family Chromodorididae.

Distribution 

References

 Ortea, J.; Espinosa, J.; Buske, Y.; Caballer, M. (2013). Additions to the inventory of the sea slugs (Opisthobranchia and Sacoglossa) from Guadeloupe (Lesser Antilles, Caribbean Sea). Revista de la Academia Canaria de Ciencias. 25: 163-194.

Chromodorididae
Gastropods described in 2013